Solid state, or solid matter, is one of the four fundamental states of matter.

Solid state may also refer to:

Electronics 
 Solid-state electronics, circuits built of solid materials
 Solid state ionics, study of ionic conductors and their uses
 Solid-state drive, a computer drive

Music 
 Solid State Records, a Christian music label
 Solid State Records (jazz label), active in the 1960s
 Solid State, a music group featuring DJ Dextrous
 Solid State (Leon Russell album), 1984
 Solid State (Jonathan Coulton album), 2017
 Solid State, an album by  Sam Phillips

Science 
 Solid-state chemistry, the study of the synthesis, structure, and properties of solid phase materials
 Solid-state physics, the study of rigid matter, or solids, through methods such as quantum mechanics, crystallography, electromagnetism, and metallurgy

See also